Wallace is an impact crater in the Hellas quadrangle on Mars at 52.9°S and 249.4°W. It is  in diameter. Its name was approved in 1973 by the International Astronomical Union (IAU) Working Group for Planetary System Nomenclature (WGPSN), and refers to British biologist Alfred Russel Wallace.

The smaller crater Tikhov is located to the northwest of Wallace, and the larger crater Secchi is to the southwest.

References 

Impact craters on Mars
Hellas quadrangle